De'Ath or de'Ath is a surname. Notable people with the surname include:

Surname
Wilfred De'ath (1937–2020), a BBC producer
Charles De'Ath (born 1968), an English actor
Rod de'Ath (1950–2014), a Welsh drummer
Lawson D'Ath (born 1992), an English footballer
Yvette D'Ath, a politician from Australia

Fictional characters
Dominic De'Ath, a character in the novel In the Red and its subsequent adaptations
Giles De'Ath, fictional character in the film Love and Death on Long Island
Sydney De'Ath, original name of the Judge Dredd character Judge Death
Theodore De'Ath, the central figure in Majella Cullinane's 2018 novel The Life of De'Ath